Ilami code is 98. In public cars, Taxis and Governal cars the letter is always the same. But in simple cars this letter (ب) depends on the city.

Road transport in Iran
Transportation in Ilam Province